The Mexico national under-23 football team (also known as Mexico Olympic football team) represents Mexico in under-23 international football competitions such as the Olympic Games and Pan American Games. The selection is limited to players under the age of 23, except for the Olympic Games which allows the men's team up to three overage players. The team is controlled by the Mexican Football Federation (FMF), the governing body of football in Mexico.

Since 1992, the under-23 team has participated in six Olympic tournaments, winning the gold medal in 2012.

Results and fixtures
The following is a list of match results from the previous 12 months, as well as any future matches that have been scheduled.

Coaching staff

Current coaching staff

Players

Current squad
The following 22 players were named to the final roster for the 2020 Summer Olympics.

* Over-aged player.

Overage players in Olympic Games

Honours
Major competitions

Summer Olympics
Gold medalists (1): 2012
Bronze medalists (1): 2020
Pan American Games
Gold medalists (2): 1999, 2011
Silver medalists (1): 2015
Bronze medalists (2): 2003, 2019
CONCACAF Olympic Qualifying Tournament
Winners (5): 1996, 2004, 2012, 2015, 2020
Runners-up (1): 1992
Third place (1): 2000

Other competitions
Central American and Caribbean Games
Gold medalists (1): 1990
Toulon Tournament
Winners (1): 2012
Third place (2): 1976, 2019
Summer Universiade
Winners (1): 1979

Competitive record

Olympic Games
Before 1984, the football tournament at the Olympic Games was played only by amateur athletes. In 1984, professionals were allowed to compete for the first time.
Since 1992, the Olympic Games tournament has been an under-23 tournament, and since 1996, the squads were allowed to have a maximum of three over-aged players.

Pre-Olympic Tournament

Pan American Games
Since 1999, the Pan American Games football tournament has been an under-23 tournament.

*Draws include knockout matches decided on penalty kicks.

See also
 Mexico national football team
 Mexico national under-20 football team
 Mexico national under-17 football team
 Mexico women's national football team
 Mexico national beach football team
 Mexico national futsal team

References

North American national under-23 association football teams
Football